Astro Star Quest (formerly Astro Talent Quest) is an annual Chinese singing competition in Malaysia organized by ASTRO Wah Lai Toi, which was first held in 1997.

This competition is aimed at showcasing and unearthing talents among young Malaysian Chinese between ages 18 to 28. The winner (and runner-up, of late) will then represent Malaysia at the International Chinese New Talent Singing Competition. Guest judges and artistes, which are invited every year, include Leehom Wang, Jay Chou, Jordan Chan, S.H.E, JJ Lin, F.I.R. and Yoga Lin.

While many talents have been birthed through this competition, it also boasts of many contestants who have gone on to become successful artistes in their own right. Notable examples would be Nicholas Teo (winner of the 2002 edition), Cao Ge (1999 finalist), Vincent Chong (2002 1st runner-up) and Anthony Chang (winner of the 2006 edition).

Competition Format 
In the initial format, the final ten contestants are selected by judges who will battle it out for the title on one night performing one song and a talent time performance each. The top three will then be chosen by a panel of judges, where after they would be subjected to a series of tests which assesses various aspects of their vocal and singing ability, such as vocal range, musical timing, vocal flexibility to adapt to different music styles, etc. The judges then determine the winner, first runner-up and second runner-up.

As of 2006, a new format was introduced whereby all contestants would go through vocal and dance trainings in addition to other challenges along the way to reach the finals. Although SMS voting was introduced (for the popularity award), the judges still held absolute decision in the contestants' fate. The talent show was eliminated as of year 2005.

The competition reaches its 20th anniversary in 2016 with the Final happening in the New Year's Eve on 31 December 2016.

Results

Guest Artistes

References 

Singing competitions
|
|}